Portrait of a Man in Profile is an oil on panel painting by Giovanni Antonio Boltraffio, created c. 1500. It is held in the National Gallery, in London. Its subject's identity is unknown, but it may be the artist's Bolognese friend Girolamo Casio. Its profile pose is typical of the Milanese School, in which the artist worked.

References

1500 paintings
Collections of the National Gallery, London
16th-century portraits
Portraits of men
Paintings by Giovanni Antonio Boltraffio